The Mitsubishi Model A is the only car built by the Mitsubishi Shipbuilding Company, a member of the Mitsubishi corporate group which would eventually evolve into Mitsubishi Motors, and the first series production automobile manufactured in Japan. It was the brainchild of Koyata Iwasaki, Mitsubishi's fourth president and the nephew of founder Yataro Iwasaki, who foresaw the vast potential of motorized vehicles and the role they would play in the economic development of Japan. Envisioned as a luxury vehicle for high echelon government officials and top executives, the Model A had to be reliable, comfortable, and a showcase of Japanese craftsmanship. After the war in 1964, Mitsubishi would use this approach again to build an exclusive sedan for government officials and top level executives with the Mitsubishi Debonair.

Because it was expensive to produce—it was built entirely by hand, with the interior rear compartment furnished with lacquered white cypress—it could not compete with cheaper American and European competition, and Mitsubishi halted production after four years. Concentrating instead on its successful Fuso commercial vehicles, the Model A would be the company's last passenger car until the Mitsubishi 500 of 1960.

At Mitsubishi's Auto Gallery (a museum of the company's most historically significant vehicles, established at their R&D Center in Okazaki in 1989) there is a replica on display, assembled in 1972 using materials of the time. It has a slightly shorter wheelbase, and uses a water-cooled 977 cc four-cylinder OHV engine instead of the larger 2.8-litre original.

References and external links
Mitsubishi Motors Web Museum
Model A replica at Mitsubishi Auto Gallery
Mitsubishi Model A specifications at Carfolio.com (these differ slightly from Mitsubishi's own figures)
"The Greatest Japanese Cars Of All Time", Michael Frank, Forbes.com, 23 April 2001

Model A
First car made by manufacturer
Cars introduced in 1917
1920s cars
Rear-wheel-drive vehicles
Sedans